Rob is a masculine given name, frequently a shortened version (hypocorism) of Robert and Robin. It may refer to:

Rob Adams (architect) (born 1948), Australian architect and urban designer
Rob Bailey (cricketer) (born 1963), English cricketer
Rob Bailey (director), English television director
Rob Bailey (musician), Australian musician
Rob Beckett (born 1986), English stand-up comedian and presenter
Rob Brown (disambiguation)
Rob Brydon (born 1965), Welsh comedian, actor, radio and host of Would I Lie To You?, singer and impressionist
Rob Burch (footballer) (born 1983), English retired football goalkeeper
Rob Burch (politician) (born 1946), American politician
Rob Davies (disambiguation)
Rob Davis (disambiguation)
Rob Deer (born 1960), American baseball player
Rob Dibble, former MLB pitcher and announcer 
Rob Dyrdek, American entrepreneur, actor, producer, reality TV personality, and former professional skateboarder.
Robert Edwards (disambiguation)
Rob Elliott, host of Wheel of Fortune Australia (1997 - 2003)
Rob Gronkowski, American football player
Rob Halford, heavy metal vocalist, lead singer for Judas Priest
Rob Harley (born 1990), Scottish rugby union player
Rob Havenstein, NFL player
Rob Hopkins (born 1968), English activist and writer, founder of the Transition Towns movement
Rob Jacobs (born 1943), Dutch association football former player and manager
Rob James (disambiguation)
Rob Jetten (born 1987), Dutch politician
Rob Johnson (disambiguation)
Rob Kaminsky (born 1994), American major league baseball pitcher
Rob Kardashian, American reality television star
Rob Knox (1989–2008), British actor
Rob Krimmel (born 1977), American basketball coach, current head coach for the Saint Francis University Red Flash
Rob Lowe, American actor
Rob Manfred (born 1958), American businessman, lawyer, sports executive, and current commissioner of Major League Baseball
Rob Mariano (born 1975), American reality television competitor, winner of Survivor: Redemption Island
Rob Moore (disambiguation)
Rob Morris (American football) (born 1975), American former National Football League player
Rob Morris (Freemason) (1818–1888), American poet and Freemason
Rob Nelson (born 1979), American biologist and documentary filmmaker
Rob Nosse, American politician
Rob Oppenheim (born 1980), American professional golfer
Rob Palmer (disambiguation)
Rob Parker (disambiguation)
Rob Portman, United States Senator
Rob Paulsen, American voice actor
Rob Reiner , American actor and film director 
Rob Riggle, American actor, comedian,and host
Rob Ryan, NFL coach
Rob Scheller (born 1927), Dutch art historian
Rob Schneider (born 1963), American actor, comedian, screenwriter and director
Rob Senderoff (born 1973), American college basketball coach
Rob Stewart (actor) (born 1961), Canadian actor
Rob Stewart (filmmaker) (born 1979), Canadian filmmaker
Rob Swearingen (born 1963), American politician
Rob Thomas, American singer, songwriter, and multi-instrumentalist best known for being the lead singer of the rock band Matchbox Twenty. 
Rob Vickers (born 1981), English rugby union player
Rob Walker (disambiguation)
Rob Warner (footballer) (born 1977), English retired footballer
Rob Warner (mountain biker) (born 1970), English mountain biker, motocross rider and TV presenter
Rob Watson (disambiguation)
Rob Wilson (disambiguation)
Rob Zombie (born 1965), American musician, film director, screenwriter and film producer 

English masculine given names
Masculine given names
Hypocorisms